The 1946–47 Divizia B was the eighth season of the second tier of the Romanian football league system.

The league was resumed after five years in which was suspended due to World War II. The format of three series was maintained, but this time the series were much larger, 15 teams in the first one, 14 for each of the other two. This season is practically the beginning of the professionalism of Romanian football, new clubs are enrolled, others are moved back in the Romanian championship. At the end of the season four teams promoted to Divizia A, the winners of the series and a fourth team established after a promotion play-off between second places and the best third place.

Team changes 
The classic format of promotion and relegation is not relevant this season because after a pause of 5 years and due to the troubled historical frame, many teams were dissolved, others were newly founded and submitted directly in the Divizia A or Divizia B and also the teams which were moved in the Hungarian football league system in 1940 after the signing of the Second Vienna Award were moved now back in the Romanian football league system after the signing of the Paris Peace Treaties. These teams were submitted also in different leagues, not counting their last rank in the Romanian football league system, but much more their situation at that time.

Promoted teams 
Jiul Petroșani and Juventus București were promoted to Divizia A, meritorious promotion due to their rankings at the end of the 1940–41 season 1st place in their series.

CFR Timișoara (6th, Serie I) and Prahova Ploiești (7th, Serie III) were also promoted to Divizia A.

Relegated teams 
Cimentul Turda, Franco-Româna Brăila, Metalosport Călan and Vitrometan Mediaș were relegated to Divizia C.

Dacia VA Galați was relegated in the local championship.

Ripensia Timișoara (3rd, Divizia A) and FC Brăila (13th, Divizia A) were relegated directly to Divizia C, without playing in the second season.

New teams 
Unirea Tricolor București was the champion of Romania at the end of the 1940–41 season, but restarted the championship in the Divizia B.

Venus București (4th, Divizia A), Mica Brad (5th, Divizia A), Sportul Studențesc (6th, Divizia A), FC Ploiești (10th, Divizia A), Gloria CFR Galați (12th, Divizia A) restarted the championship in the Divizia B.

Gloria Arad (8th, Divizia A), promoted in 1940, was relegated back to the second league.

AMEF Arad and Feroemail Ploiești were re-enrolled in the Romanian football league system after the abusively exclusion commanded by the legionary regime in 1940.

CFR Târgu Mureș, Crișana Oradea, Dermata Cluj, Oltul Sfântu Gheorghe, Phoenix Baia Mare, Stăruința Satu Mare and Victoria Cluj moved in the Romanian football league system due to the Paris Peace Treaties, territory of Northern Transylvania being assigned from Hungary back to Romania.

Arsenal Sibiu, CFR Craiova, CFR Caracal, CFR Turda, Dezrobirea Constanța, FC Călărași, Grivița CFR București, IAR Brașov, Karres Mediaș, Politehnica Iași, Sparta Arad, Sporting Pitești, Socec Lafayette București, Solvay Uioara, ST București, Șurianul Sebeș and Textila Buhuși were promoted to Divizia B due to the results obtained in the regional championships.

Dissolved teams 
AS Constanța, Ateneul Tătărași Iași, Olympia București, Rapid Timișoara and Turda București were dissolved.

Renamed teams 
Crișana CFR Arad was renamed as CFR Arad.

Oltul Sfântu Gheorghe was renamed as Textila Sfântu Gheorghe.

Sportul Studențesc București was renamed as Sparta București

SSM Reșița was renamed as Locomotiva Reșița.

Vulturii Textila Lugoj was renamed as 23 August Lugoj.

Other teams 
Chinezul Timișoara and CAM Timișoara merged, the first one being absorbed by the second one.

Crișana Oradea and CFR Oradea merged and the club was renamed as Crișana CFR Oradea.

League map

League tables

Serie I

Serie II

Serie III

Promotion play-off 
Second place from each series and the best third place played a promotion play-off to decide the fourth team which promoted to 1947–48 Divizia A.

Semi-finals 

|}

Final 

|}

Notes:
 Karres Mediaș promoted to 1947–48 Divizia A.

See also 

 1946–47 Divizia A

References

Liga II seasons
Romania
2